Franz Anton Leopold Lafontaine (14 January 1756 – 12 December 1812) was a German-born Polish military surgeon. He was known as the editor of the first Polish medical journal and for his work on catarrh.

Early life 
Leopold was born in Biberach as the son of Benno Leopold Ignatius Lafontaine (1731-1777) and his wife, Maria Katharina Franziska Leonhardt (b. 1725).

Marriage and descendants 
He married Maria Theresia Kornély (1765-1827). They had two daughters:
 Sophie (1790-1831); married Count Hans Moritz von Hauke. Through her, Lafontaine was the maternal grandfather of Princess Julia of Battenberg.  Through her, Lafontaine is an ancestor to Charles III and other descendants of Prince Philip, Duke of Edinburgh in the British Royal Family, and also an ancestor to current members of the Spanish Royal Family, including King Felipe VI of Spain. 
 Victorina (1797-1849), married first Kazimierz Tomasz Słupecki, Rawicz coat of arms (1782-1832); married secondly Stanislaus Albert Friedrich von Lessel (1807-1888) and had issue from both marriages.

References

1756 births
1812 deaths
18th-century German physicians
German surgeons